Malik Jordan McLemore (born 16 January 1997) is a German-American professional footballer who plays as an attacking midfielder for 1. FC Schweinfurt 05.

Career
McLemore made his professional debut for Greuther Fürth in the 2. Bundesliga on 8 March 2020, coming on as a substitute in the 83rd minute for Kenny Prince Redondo in the away match against Holstein Kiel, which finished as a 1–1 draw. In July 2021, he signed for tier-four Regionalliga Bayern club 1. FC Schweinfurt 05.

References

External links
 
 

1997 births
Living people
Sportspeople from Wiesbaden
Association football forwards
Footballers from Hesse
German footballers
American soccer players
German people of American descent
SV Gonsenheim players
SpVgg Bayern Hof players
SpVgg Greuther Fürth II players
SpVgg Greuther Fürth players
1. FC Schweinfurt 05 players
2. Bundesliga players
Regionalliga players